Artia  is a genus of plants in the family Apocynaceae first described as a genus in 1941. The entire group is endemic to New Caledonia in the SW Pacific, including the nearby Loyalty Islands. It is closely related to Parsonsia and Prestonia.

Species
 Artia amieuensis Guillaumin
 Artia balansae (Baill.) Pichon ex Guillaumin
 Artia brachycarpa (Baill.) Boiteau
 Artia francii (Guillaumin) Pichon
 Artia lifuana (Baill.) Pichon ex Guillaumin - C New Caledonia + Loyalty Islands

Formerly included
Artia penangiana (King & Gamble) Pichon, syn of Parsonsia penangiana King & Gamble

References

Endemic flora of New Caledonia
Apocynaceae genera
Echiteae